The first season of the CBS American television drama series Unforgettable was premiered on September 20, 2011, and concluded on May 8, 2012, after 22 episodes. It was broadcast on Tuesdays at 10:00 pm.

Plot 
A former Syracuse, New York, police detective, Carrie Wells, has hyperthymesia, a rare medical condition that gives her the ability to visually remember everything. She reluctantly joins the New York City Police Department's Queens homicide unit after her former boyfriend and partner asks for help with solving a case. The move allows her to try to find out the one thing she has been unable to remember, which is what happened on the day her sister was murdered.

Cast

Main cast 
 Poppy Montgomery as Det. Carrie Wells
 Dylan Walsh as Lt. Al Burns
 Kevin Rankin as Det. Roe Sanders
 Michael Gaston as Det. Mike Costello
 Daya Vaidya as Det. Nina Inara
 Jane Curtin as Dr. Joanne Webster

Recurring cast 
 Britt Lower as Tanya Sitkowsky
 Omar Metwally as ADA Adam Gilroy
 Deanna Dunagan as Alice Wells
 Haley Murphy as Rachel Wells
 James Urbaniak as Walter Morgan
 Victoria Leigh as Young Carrie

Episodes

Ratings

References

2011 American television seasons
2012 American television seasons
1